Carolina Malchair Selecque (born 31 May 1982) is a Spanish rhythmic gymnast, born in Marbella. She competed at the 2000 Summer Olympics in Sydney.

Notes

References

External links

1982 births
Living people
People from Marbella
Sportspeople from the Province of Málaga
Spanish rhythmic gymnasts
Olympic gymnasts of Spain
Gymnasts at the 2000 Summer Olympics